The Bonnier family is a Swedish family, originally of German Jewish descent, who since the beginning of the 19th century has been active in the book industry and later also in the mass media industry. They own the media group Bonnier Group, with the largest owners being Åke Bonnier and Jonas Bonnier. The group has 175 companies in 18 countries.

History

The earliest known member of the patriarchal line of the family was a cloth salesman named Jacob Schye (born 1674), who was from the town of Sobědruhy (Soborten) in Bohemia (now in the Czech Republic). His son, the jeweler Löbel Schie (1718–1790), fathered the jeweler and coin dealer Löbel Salomon Hirschel (born 1745). Hirschel's son, Gutkind Hirschel (1778–1862), moved from Germany to Copenhagen, Denmark, in 1801 and changed his name to Gerhard Bonnier. There, Gerhard started a small book store in 1804.

Gerhard's oldest son, Adolf Bonnier (1806–1867), moved to Gothenburg, Sweden, in 1827 to expand the family business. He started a library in the city the following year and another one in Stockholm a few years after. Adolf Bonnier started a publishing company, Albert Bonniers Förlag in 1837 and his two younger brothers, David Felix Bonnier (1822–1881) and Albert Bonnier (1820–1900), soon moved to Stockholm to help with the business.

Notable members
 Gerhard Bonnier (1778–1862), book seller
 Albert Bonnier (1820–1900), publisher
 Eva Bonnier (1855–1907), painter
 Karl Otto Bonnier (1856–1941), publisher
 Tor Bonnier (1883–1976), publisher
 Åke Bonnier (1886–1979), publisher
 Albert Bonnier Jr. (1907–1989), publisher
 Joakim Bonnier (1930–1972), Formula One driver
 Lukas Bonnier (1922–2006), publisher
 Åke Bonnier (born 1957), bishop in the Diocese of Skara, today the second largest owner of the Bonnier Group.
 Jack Bonnier (born 1963), novelist
 Karl-Adam Bonnier (born 1934), entrepreneur
 Anna Rantala Bonnier (born 1983), Social worker and politician for Feminist Initiative.

Gallery

References 

 
Swedish publishers (people)
Swedish mass media families
Swedish people of Czech descent
Swedish people of Jewish descent